Adolphe-Léopold Danhauser (26 February 1835 – 9 June 1896) was a French musician, educator, music theorist and composer.

Life and career
Adolphe Danhauser was born in Paris and studied at the Paris Conservatoire with François Bazin, Fromental Halévy and Napoléon Henri Reber. He won the Second Prix de Rome in 1863 and began to develop an interest in early music education while still at the Conservatoire. In 1872 he published Theory of Music which is still printed and considered authoritative. In 1875, Danhauser was appointed chief inspector of instruction in singing in the schools of Paris. Later he took the position of professor of solfeggio at the Paris Conservatoire. He conducted a tour through the Netherlands, Belgium and Switzerland to survey systems of music pedagogy. Danhauser died in Paris.

Notable students include Charles Malherbe.

Works
Selected compositions include:
Maures et Castillans, opera in three acts (unproduced)
Le Proscrit, one-act musical drama with chorus, 1866
Orphéoniques evenings, collection
Mélodies Vocales

Danhauser books on music theory and teaching have been reprinted, translated, and reviewed. These include:

Music theory, Paris, H. Lemoine, 1872
Music theory, revised edition by Henri Rabaud, Paris, H. Lemoine, 1928
Music theory, revised and enlarged edition, Paris, H. Lemoine, 1994 
Questionnaire. Appendix to the theory of music, Paris, H. Lemoine, 1879
Questionnaire. Appendix to Music Theory, revised edition by Henri Rabaud, Paris, H. Lemoine, 1928
Abstract of the theory of music, Paris, H. Lemoine, 1879
Abstract of music theory, revised edition by Henri Rabaud, Paris, H. Lemoine, 1928
Abstract of the theory of music, new and revised edition by Sophie Jouve-Ganvert, Paris, H. Lemoine, 1990
Solfeggio solfeggios, Paris, H. Lemoine, 3 volumes, 1881-1907

References

1835 births
1896 deaths
Burials at Batignolles Cemetery
19th-century classical composers
French male classical composers
French music educators
French opera composers
Pupils of Napoléon Henri Reber
French Romantic composers
Prix de Rome for composition
19th-century French composers
19th-century French male musicians